Richard Konwiarz (15 February 1883 – 14 December 1960) was a German architect. He was born in Tschempin and died in Hanover.

In 1932 he won a bronze medal in the art competitions of the Olympic Games for his design of the "Schlesierkampfbahn" in the Sport Park of Breslau.

In the years 1952 to 1954 he constructed in cooperation with Heinz Goesmann the Niedersachsenstadion in Hanover. Meanwhile, it is rebuilt and modified and called by its sponsor AWD-Arena.

References

External links
 profile 

1883 births
1960 deaths
20th-century German architects
Olympic bronze medalists in art competitions
Medalists at the 1932 Summer Olympics
Olympic competitors in art competitions